Andreja Efremov (Macedonian: Андреја Ефремов, born 2 September 1992) is a Macedonian footballer who plays as a goalkeeper for Borec Veles. He has also represented Macedonia in the UEFA European Under-21 Championship.

International career 
He made his senior debut for Macedonia in a May 2014 friendly match against Qatar and has earned a total of 2 caps, scoring no goals. His second and final international was a June 2014 friendly away against China.

References

External links
 
 Player Profile at National-Football-Teams

1992 births
Living people
People from Sveti Nikole
Association football goalkeepers
Macedonian footballers
North Macedonia youth international footballers
North Macedonia under-21 international footballers
North Macedonia international footballers
FK Metalurg Skopje players
FK Rabotnički players
FK Renova players
F.C. Famalicão players
FC Lokomotiv 1929 Sofia players
FK Sileks players
KF Vllaznia Shkodër players
FK Borec players
Macedonian First Football League players
Liga Portugal 2 players
Second Professional Football League (Bulgaria) players
Kategoria Superiore players
Macedonian expatriate footballers
Expatriate footballers in Portugal
Macedonian expatriate sportspeople in Portugal
Expatriate footballers in Bulgaria
Macedonian expatriate sportspeople in Bulgaria
Expatriate footballers in Albania
Macedonian expatriate sportspeople in Albania